Guttahalli is a small village in the Bangarapet Taluk of Kolar district in Karnataka, India. It is situated about 7 kilometers from Bangarapet.

Demographics 
According to the 2011 Indian Census, the village consists of 300 people. The town has a literacy rate of 62.33 percent which is lower than Karnataka's average of 75.36 percent.

References

Villages in Kolar district